San Juan Unified School District is a school district in Sacramento County, California, that serves all or part of the following cities and unincorporated communities:
Antelope
Arden-Arcade
Carmichael
Citrus Heights
Fair Oaks
Folsom
Gold River
McClellan Park
North Highlands
Orangevale
Rancho Cordova
Sacramento

San Juan Unified includes numerous elementary schools, eight K-8 schools, eight middle schools, and nine high schools. There are also a number of alternative schools, early childhood centers, and adult education centers.

High schools
The district's nine comprehensive high schools include:
Bella Vista High School
Casa Roble High School
Del Campo High School
El Camino Fundamental High School
Encina Preparatory High School
Mesa Verde High School
Mira Loma High School
Rio Americano High School
San Juan High School

Middle schools
San Juan Unified School District has a total of eight middle schools:
Arcade Fundamental Middle School
Arden Middle School
John Barrett Middle School 
Andrew Carnegie Middle School
Winston Churchill Middle School
Louis Pasteur Middle School
Will Rogers Middle School
Sylvan Middle School

K-8 schools
Gold River Discovery Center
Kingswood K-8
Lichen K-8
Orangevale Open K-8
Sierra Oaks K-8
Starr King K-8
Thomas Edison Language Institute
Woodside K-8

Elementary schools
Arlington Heights Elementary
Cambridge Heights Elementary
Cameron Ranch Elementary
Carmichael Elementary
Carriage Drive Elementary
Cottage Elementary
James R. Cowan Fundamental Elementary
Coyle Avenue Elementary
Del Dayo Elementary
Del Paso Manor Elementary
Deterding Elementary
Harry Dewey Fund. Elementary
Dyer-Kelly Elementary
Grand Oaks Elementary
Green Oaks Fundamental Elementary
Greer Elementary
Howe Avenue Elementary
Thomas Kelly Elementary
Earl Le Gette Elementary
Mariemont Elementary
Mariposa Elementary
Mission Avenue Elementary
Northridge Elementary
Oakview Community Elementary
Ottoman Elementary
Pasadena Elementary
Charles Peck Elementary
Pershing Elementary
Albert Schweitzer Elementary
Skycrest Elementary
Trajan Elementary
Twin Lakes Elementary
Whitney Avenue Elementary

Continuation schools
La Entrada Continuation/AdvancePath Academy
Laurel Ruff - Community Transition Programs (special education)
Sunrise Tech Center

Other
Camp Winthers Camp owned by (San Juan Unified)
El Sereno High School (Independent Study)
La Vista Center (Special education)
Ralph Richardson Center (Special education)

References

Sources
 Welcome to San Juan Unified

School districts in Sacramento County, California
Carmichael, California
Education in Sacramento, California
School districts established in 1960
1960 establishments in California